Thomas or Tom Reed may refer to:

Politicians and military
 Thomas Buck Reed (1787–1829), senator from Mississippi
 Thomas Reed (British Army officer) (1796–1883), British general
 Thomas Brackett Reed (1839–1902), Speaker of the House of Representatives from Maine
 Thomas C. Reed (born 1934), American Secretary of the Air Force and nuclear weapons designer
 Tom Reed (politician) (born 1971), representative for the state of New York

Others
 Thomas German Reed (1817–1888), English actor, composer, and theatrical manager
 Thomas Reed (architect) (1817–1878), Danish architect
 T. S. Reed (Thomas Sadler Reed, 1818–1914), public servant in South Australia
 Tom Reed (screenwriter) (1901–1961), American screenwriter
 Tom Reed (bishop) (1902–1995), Anglican Archbishop of Adelaide
 Tom Reed (American football) (1945–2022), American football coach
 Tom Reed (judoka) (born 1986), British judoka

See also
Thomas Read (disambiguation)
Thomas Reid (disambiguation)
 Reed (name)